Main Offender is the second studio album by Keith Richards, released in 1992 between the Rolling Stones' Steel Wheels and Voodoo Lounge projects.

Richards teamed with Talk Is Cheap collaborator Steve Jordan and added Waddy Wachtel to the mix both in composing and producing Main Offender. Sessions with Richards' group of musician friends known as "The X-Pensive Winos" took place in California and New York City from March to September 1992, with touring in Europe's autumn and early 1993 in North America.

Main Offender was released in October 1992 to generally positive reviews. However, it failed to match the commercial success of Talk Is Cheap, reaching No. 45 in the UK, and No. 99 in the US. After the Main Offender tour, Richards returned to recording exclusively with the Rolling Stones and did not release another solo album until Crosseyed Heart in 2015. In 2022 the album was reissued to mark its 30th anniversary. The reissued featured the previously unreleased concert album Winos Live in London ’92.

Track listing
"999" (Keith Richards, Steve Jordan, Waddy Wachtel) – 5:50
"Wicked as It Seems" (Richards, Jordan, Charley Drayton) – 4:45
"Eileen" (Richards, Jordan) – 4:29
"Words of Wonder" (Richards, Jordan, Wachtel) – 6:35
"Yap Yap" (Richards, Jordan, Wachtel) – 4:43
"Bodytalks" (Richards, Jordan, Drayton, Sarah Dash) – 5:20
"Hate It When You Leave" (Richards, Jordan, Wachtel) – 4:59
"Runnin' Too Deep" (Richards, Jordan) – 3:20
"Will but You Won't" (Richards, Jordan) – 5:05
"Demon" (Richards, Jordan) – 4:45
"Key to the Highway" (Charlie Segar, Big Bill Broonzy) – 3:21 (Japanese issue bonus track)

Winos Live In London ‘92 
Released as part of the 30th Anniversary reissue.

"Take It So Hard" (Richards, Jordan) – 4:15
"999" (Richards, Jordan, Wachtel) – 6:45
"Wicked As It Seems" (Richards, Jordan, Drayton) – 5:14
"How I Wish" (Richards, Jordan) – 4:31
"Gimme Shelter" (Mick Jagger, Richards) – 6:10
"Hate It When You Leave" (Richards, Jordan, Wachtel) – 6:39
"Before They Make Me Run" (Jagger, Richards) – 3:31
"Eileen" (Richards, Jordan) – 5:42
"Will But You Won’t" (Richards, Jordan) – 7:30
"Bodytalks" (Richards, Jordan, Drayton, Dash) – 6:53
"Happy" (Jagger, Richards) – 8:28
"Whip It Up" (Richards, Jordan) – 8:33

Personnel
Keith Richards – vocals, guitar, bass guitar, keyboards, percussion
Steve Jordan – drums, conga, percussion, castanets, Farfisa organ, backing vocals 
Waddy Wachtel – guitar, piano, celesta, percussion, backing vocals
Charley Drayton – bass guitar, piano, Hammond B-3 electric organ, baritone guitar, backing vocals
Ivan Neville – piano, organ, harpsichord, clavinet, vibes, bass guitar, backing vocals
Sarah Dash – vocals on "Bodytalks", backing vocals
Bernard Fowler – backing vocals
Babi Floyd – backing vocals
Jack Bashkow – woodwind
Crispin Cioe – woodwind
Arno Hecht – woodwind
Technical
Don Smith, Joe Blaney - recording
Niko Bolas, Don Smith, Joe Blaney - mixing
Mick Haggerty - art direction
Dewey Nicks - black & white photography
David LaChapelle - colour photography
Ted Jensen - mastering

Charts

References

1992 albums
Keith Richards albums
Virgin Records albums
Albums produced by Waddy Wachtel